Out of the Loop is an album by the Brecker Brothers that was released by GRP Records in 1994. In 1995 the album won the brothers two Grammy Awards for Best Contemporary Jazz Performance (now known as Best Contemporary Jazz Album) and Best Instrumental Composition (for Michael Brecker's "African Skies").

Reception 
At AllMusic,  Jim Newsom gave the album four stars and wrote, "The album is surprisingly strong, and any fears of a paint-by-numbers attempt to cash in on past glories are quickly dispelled with the opening 'Slang', which is reminiscent of Amandla-era Miles. Here, as throughout the disc, Michael's sax solo burns with abandon, while brother Randy's trumpet glides across a tastefully smooth and melodic terrain".

Track listing

Personnel 

 Michael Brecker – tenor saxophone, arrangements (1, 5, 8), soprano saxophone (4, 5), Akai EWI (4, 5, 7, 8)
 Randy Brecker – trumpet (1, 2, 3, 5-8), flugelhorn (4, 9), arrangements (7)
 George Whitty – keyboards (1, 7, 8, 9), Hammond organ bass (1), arrangements (1, 5, 7, 8, 9), acoustic piano (2), keyboard programming (4)
 Chris Botti – keyboard programming (2), bass and drum programming (2), arrangements (2)
 Andy Snitzer – keyboard programming (2), bass and drum programming (2), arrangements (2)
 Maz Kessler – keyboards (3, 6), rhythm programming (3), arrangements (3, 6)
 Robbie Kilgore – keyboards (3, 6), rhythm programming (3), arrangements (3, 6), guitars (6)
 Eliane Elias – keyboards (4), vocals (4), arrangements (4)
 Dean Brown – guitars (1, 2, 3, 6-9), electric guitar (4, 5)
 Larry Saltzman – guitars (2)
 James Genus – bass (1, 4, 7, 8, 9), acoustic bass (3)
 Armand Sabal-Lecco – bass (5), acoustic piccolo bass (5), vocals (5)
 Steve Jordan – drums (1, 7, 8, 9)
 Shawn Pelton – drums (2)
 Rodney Holmes – drums (4, 5)
 Steve Thornton – percussion (1, 2, 4, 5, 7, 8, 9)
 Mark Ledford – additional backing vocals (4)

Production

 Dave Grusin – executive producer
 Larry Rosen – executive producer
 George Whitty – producer (1, 5, 7, 8, 9), additional recording
 Chris Botti – producer (2), additional recording
 Andy Snitzer – producer (2), additional recording
 Maz Kessler – producer (3, 6), mixing (3, 6), additional recording
 Robbie Kilgore – producer (3, 6), mixing (3, 6), additional recording
 Elaine Elias – producer (4), editing
 James Farber – recording, mixing (1, 2, 4, 5, 7, 8, 9)
 "Q" Engstrom – mixing (3, 6)
 Rich Lamb – additional recording
 Hiro Ishihara – assistant engineer
 Chris Albert – mix assistant (1, 2, 4, 5, 7, 8, 9)
 Scott Austin – mix assistant (1, 2, 4, 5, 7, 8, 9)
 Rory Romano – mix assistant (1, 2, 4, 5, 7, 8, 9)
 Robert Smith – mix assistant (3, 6)
 Ron Bach – editing engineer
 Joseph Doughney – post-production engineer 
 Michael Landy – post-production engineer 
 Scott Hull – mastering at Masterdisk (New York, NY)
 Cara Bridgins – production coordinator 
 Joseph Moore – assistant production coordinator 
 Sonny Mediana – production director, art direction 
 Andy Baltimore – creative director 
 Darryl Pitt – cover concept 
 Laurie Goldman – graphic design
 Matt Zumbo – front cover illustration 
 Kim Steele – back cover photography

Awards 
Grammy Awards

References 

1994 albums
GRP Records albums
Brecker Brothers albums
Grammy Award for Best Contemporary Jazz Album